Bundesgesetzblatt, abbreviated BGBl (Federal Law Gazette, Federal Gazette) may refer to:

 Bundesgesetzblatt (Germany)
 Bundesgesetzblatt (Austria)
  (1867–1871), Federal Gazette of the North German Confederation
  (1871), continuation of the Federal Gazette of the North German Confederation

See also 
 Federal Gazette (disambiguation)